Rockefeller Chapel is a Gothic Revival chapel on the campus of the University of Chicago in Chicago, Illinois. A monumental example of Collegiate Gothic architecture, it was meant by patron John D. Rockefeller to be the "central and dominant feature" of the campus; at 200.7 feet it is by covenant the tallest building on campus and seats 1700. The current dean is Maurice Charles, an Episcopal priest.

Design
Designed by architect Bertram Goodhue between 1918 and 1924, and built between 1925 and 1928 without the use of structural steel, it contains about 70 integrated figural sculptures by sculptors Lee Lawrie and Ulric Ellerhusen, and interior work by mosaicist Hildreth Meiere. Today the chapel is used for ecumenical worship services, university convocations, guest speakers, musical programs, weddings, memorial services, and occasional film screenings. It occupies most of a block and can seat 1700 people.

The woodcarvings that adorn the organ and South balcony were created by Alois Lang, a Master Woodcarver at the American Seating Co., and one of the artists responsible for bringing the medieval art of ecclesiastical carving back to life. His pieces in Rockefeller Chapel are carved from White Appalachian Oak.

Carillon
The chapel contains the Laura Spelman Rockefeller Memorial Carillon and tower, a separate gift from John D. Rockefeller, Jr. in 1932 in honor of his mother. This 72-bell carillon is the second-largest carillon in the world by mass, after the carillon at Riverside Church on the Upper West Side of New York City, which Rockefeller Jr. also donated in honor of his mother.

References

External links

 A detailed architectural guide to the Rockefeller chapel
 Photos of the Rockefeller Chapel at Chicago Pictures

Bell towers in the United States
Buildings associated with the Rockefeller family
Carillons
University of Chicago
Churches in Chicago
University and college chapels in the United States
Towers in Illinois
Bertram Goodhue church buildings
Gothic Revival church buildings in Illinois
Chicago Landmarks
Hyde Park, Chicago